St. Clement's Basilica is the main Roman Catholic church in the city of Hanover. It is dedicated to Saint Clement of Rome. It is part of the parish of St. Heinrich and belongs to the Diocese of Hildesheim.

History
Construction started in 1712, and finished in 1718. This was the first Roman Catholic church to be built in Hanover since the Reformation, when the Kingdom of Hanover became Protestant.

The church was almost totally destroyed during the Allied bombings in 1943 during World War II, as Hanover and other major cities were major targets for strategic bombing in an effort to cripple the Nazi regime. Reconstruction began in 1946, and the completed church was dedicated on 24 November 1957. On 12 March 1998, Pope John Paul II made the church a Minor Basilica.

Notable burials
Tommaso Giusti (de), Italian architect who designed St. Clement's

References

External links
Official Website

Hanover
Clement
Clemens
Church buildings with domes
Churches in the Diocese of Hildesheim
Roman Catholic churches in Lower Saxony